Nudaria fasciata is a moth of the subfamily Arctiinae first described by Frederic Moore in 1878. It is found in Tibet and the Indian states of Sikkim and Assam.

References

Nudariina